Chil Sar may refer to:
 Chil Sar, Dashtiari
 Chil Sar, Polan